Jade Hopper (born 13 July 1991) is a former professional Australian tennis player playing in the ITF Women's Circuit. On 31 January 2011 she reached her highest WTA singles ranking of 448. On 14 February 2011 she reached her highest WTA doubles ranking of 174.

Personal life 
Jade was born to Gavin and Karen Hopper . She currently is a lawyer and resides in Melbourne, Australia. She holds a Master of Laws from the University of Melbourne,a Graduate Diploma of Legal Practise from ANU,a Bachelor of Laws from the University of Southern Queensland,a Bachelor of Arts (Communication) from Griffith University,a Graduate Certificate of Business from Deakin University and an MBA from Bilgi University.  Jade was the subject of two ABC Australian Story episodes in 2002 and 2011.

ITF Circuit finals

Singles finals: 1 (0–1)

Doubles: 12 (4–8)

References

External links
 
 
 

1991 births
Living people
Australian female tennis players
Sportswomen from Victoria (Australia)
Tennis people from the Gold Coast
Sportswomen from Queensland
Tennis players from Melbourne
21st-century Australian women